was a Japanese billionaire businessman, the chairman and founder of Unicharm.

Early life

Career

Personal life
Takahara was married with three children and lived in Tokyo. His son Takahisa Takahara is president and CEO of Unicharm. According to Forbes, Takahara had a net worth of $5.2 billion, at the time of his death.  He received a Doctorate Honoris Causa in Humanities from Anaheim University in 2000.

References 

1931 births
Japanese billionaires
20th-century Japanese businesspeople
21st-century Japanese businesspeople
2018 deaths